Hotel Monterey is a 1973 American silent documentary film directed by Chantal Akerman. It is Akerman's first feature film.

In 2013, Akerman introduced Hotel Monterey, along with two other films, La Chambre and News from Home at the 11th annual "Save and Project" film series at the New York Museum of Modern Art.

Synopsis 
The film consists of a series of silent long takes shot in a hotel in New York City. Shots are meticulously staged to create visual patterns and optical illusions as the film slowly explores several different parts of the hotel, ranging from austere and claustrophobic basement corridors to hotel rooms—some occupied, some not—to skylines of neighboring building roofs and water towers shot from the rooftop.

Location
The hotel, located at 215 West 94th Street in Manhattan, opened in 1914 as the Hotel Apthorp.  In 1916, the name changed to Hotel Monterey, the name it retained until 1976.  By 2008, it had become Days Hotel, part of the Days Inn/Quality Inn chain.

Release
The Criterion Collection released it through their Eclipse series in 2010, as part of a set titled Chantal Akerman in the Seventies. The set included four feature films Akerman directed in the 1970s as well as a number of short films.

See also
 List of Eclipse releases

References

External links
 

1973 films
Belgian documentary films
Films directed by Chantal Akerman
Documentary films about New York City
American documentary films
1970s avant-garde and experimental films
1970s American films
1980s American films